This is a list of episodes from the twelfth season of Shark Tank. The season premiered on October 16, 2020, on ABC.

The 12th season was filmed inside a production bubble at the Venetian Las Vegas to allow for social distancing during the COVID-19 pandemic.

Episodes

Guest sharks this season include Blake Mycoskie, founder of TOMS and co-founder of Madefor, and Kendra Scott, founder and CEO of Kendra Scott LLC. Returning guest Sharks include Alex Rodriguez, baseball player and founder and CEO of A-Rod Corp, and Daniel Lubetzky, founder and executive chairman of Kind.

References

External links 
 Official website
 

12
2020 American television seasons
2021 American television seasons